The Bangladeshi taka is the currency of Bangladesh.

Taka may also refer to:

People
 Taka (given name), a masculine Japanese given name

Nicknamed or pseudonym
 William Tucker (settler) (1784–1817), early settler in New Zealand, called Taka by Maori
 , also known as DJ Taka, popular Bemani artist
 , Japanese artist nicknamed "Taka", "Taka-san", "Taka-chan"
 : Kazuko, Princess Taka

Surnamed
 Chazel Taka (1929–1974), Iraqi poet and politician
 Efraim Taka (born 1989), Israeli footballer; see List of Israeli football transfers summer 2014
 , Japanese academic
 Jussi Taka (born 1993) Finnish snowboarder
 Taka Sisters (disbanded 1936), Japanese-American Vaudeville act comprising three sisters Taka: Myrtle (1916-2011), Midi (1914-1936), Mary (1912-1991)
 , Japanese American actress
 Osman Taka (died 1887), Albanian dancer
 Seveci Taka (born 1981), Fijian rugby player
 , Japanese ice hockey player
 Tony Taka (born 1971), Japanese mangaka and artist

Fictional characters
 Scar (The Lion King), known as "Taka" in the Disney Lion King Backstory

Places
 Taka, Hyōgo, a town in Taka District, Japan
 Taka District, Hyōgo, a county-level unit in Japan
 Mount Taka (Osaka/Hyōgo), a mountain in Japan
 Taka Island (Taka-shima), a Japanese island in the Kujūku Islands
 Taka Atoll, a coral atoll in the Ratak Chain of the Marshall Islands
 Təkyə, Azerbaijan
 Taka, a former name for the district around Kassala, Sudan, now Kassala; see Alodia

Other uses
 Taka (film), a 2005 Bangladeshi drama film
 Taka (paper mache), Filipino paper mache
 Taka (boat), a traditional small boat used for carrying load or passengers, often built by Laz people of the Black Sea region
 Al-Taka SC, a Sudanese soccer club
 Taka, the term used in Bengali-speaking regions and sometimes in Maithili-speaking regions of India for Indian Rupee
 History of the taka, historical currencies so named

See also
 Taqa (disambiguation)
 TACA (disambiguation)
 Tacca (disambiguation)

Japanese-language surnames